The Brescia and Garda Prealps (Prealpi Bresciane e Gardesane in Italian) are a mountain range in the southern part of the Alps. They are located mainly in Lombardy but also in Trentino Alto Adige and in Veneto, in the northern part of Italy.

Geography
Administratively the range is divided between the Italian provinces of Trento (in the Region of Trentino Alto Adige), Verona (in the Region of Veneto) and Brescia (in the Region of Lombardy).

The easternmost slopes of the mountains are drained by the Adige, the central and western part of the range by Chiese, Sarca, Oglio and other minor rivers and streams, all of them tributaries of the Po .

SOIUSA classification
According to SOIUSA (International Standardized Mountain Subdivision of the Alps) the mountain range is an Alpine section, classified in the following way:
 main part = Eastern Alps
 major sector = Southern Limestone Alps
 section = Brescia and Garda Prealps
 code = II/C-30

Borders
Brescia and Garda Prealps' borders are (clockwise):
 Oglio river, Iseo lake and Val Camonica (west), which divide them from the Bergamasque Alps and Prealps;
 Croce Domini Pass and Giudicarie (north), which divide them from the southern Rhaetian Alps;
 Adige river (east), which divides them from the Venetian Prealps;
 Po Plain (south).

Subdivision
The Brescia and Garda Prealps are subdivided into two subsections:
 Brescia Prealps - SOIUSA code:II/C-30.I
 Garda Prealps - SOIUSA code:II/C-30.II,
which are separated by the Valle Sabbia.

These subsections are further divided in supergroups:
 Brescia Prealps:
 supergroup Catena Setteventi-Muffetto-Guglielmo  - SOIUSA code:II/C-30.I-A,
 supergroup Catena Dosso Alto-Monte Palo  - SOIUSA code:II/C-30.I-B;
 Garda Prealps:
 supergroup Prealpi Giudicarie - SOIUSA code:II/C-30.II-A,
 supergroup Prealpi Gardesane Sud-occidentali - SOIUSA code:II/C-30.II-B,
 supergroup Prealpi Gardesane Orientali - SOIUSA code:II/C-30.II-C.

Summits

The chief summits of the range are:

References

Maps
 Italian official cartography (Istituto Geografico Militare - IGM); on-line version: www.pcn.minambiente.it

Mountain ranges of the Alps
Mountain ranges of Lombardy
Landforms of Trentino-Alto Adige/Südtirol
Landforms of Veneto
Province of Brescia
Province of Verona
Trentino